Luzula orestera, with the common name Sierra woodrush, is a species of flowering plant in the rush family. It is endemic to the High Sierra Nevada of California, where it grows in fellfields, talus, and other habitat in regions of subalpine and alpine climates.

Description
Luzula orestera is a perennial herb forming tough clumps of several stiff, erect stems up to about 26 centimeters in maximum height surrounded by many grasslike leaves. The stem and leaves are generally reddish in color. The inflorescence is a triangular cluster of several dark brown flowers tucked between reddish, pointed bracts.

External links
Jepson Manual Treatment - Luzula orestera
Luzula orestera - Photo gallery

orestera
Endemic flora of California
Flora of the Sierra Nevada (United States)
Alpine flora
Plants described in 1958
Flora without expected TNC conservation status